Ceylan is a Turkish given name and also surname (meaning "gazelle" in Persian carān جران) and may refer to:

Given name
Ceylan (born 1974), Turkish singer
Ceylan Arısan (born 1994), Turkish female volleyball player

Surname
Abdil Ceylan (born 1983), Turkish long-distance and marathon runner
Bülent Ceylan (born 1976), German comedian of Turkish origin
Ebru Caylan (born 1976), Turkish photographer, actress, screenwriter and art director.
Ebru Ceylan (volleyball) (born 1987), Turkish volleyball player
Fatih Ceylan (born 1980), Turkish footballer
Murat Ceylan (born 1988), Turkish footballer
Nuri Bilge Ceylan (born 1959), Turkish film director
Taner Ceylan (born 1967), German photo-realist artist of Turkish origin
Ufuk Ceylan (born 1986), Turkish footballer

See also
 Ceylan, Çermik

Turkish-language surnames